"Bonanza" is the musical theme for the NBC western television series Bonanza starring Lorne Greene. It was written for the series by Jay Livingston and Raymond Evans.

In 1961, it became a hit for Al Caiola and His Orchestra, whose instrumental recording (United Artists 302, backed with "Bounty Hunter") reached number 19 on the Billboard Hot 100.

Johnny Cash version 

Johnny Cash recorded an own version, with lyrics rewritten by him and his friend Johnny Western, and released it as a single on Columbia Records (Columbia 4-42512, "Bonanza!" with "Pick a Bale o' Cotton" on the opposite side) in July or August 1962. The Billboard magazine evaluated the single upon its release as having a "moderate sales potential", but "Bonanza" only grazed the Hot 100 and entirely missed the Billboard country chart, while "Pick a Bale o' Cotton" didn't make either.

Background

Track listing

Charts 
Al Caiola and His Orchestra version

Johnny Cash version

References 

Johnny Cash songs
1961 singles
1962 singles
Songs with music by Jay Livingston
Columbia Records singles
1961 songs
Songs with lyrics by Ray Evans
Song recordings produced by Don Law
Bonanza